Colin Ayre (born 14 March 1956, in Ashington, Northumberland) was an English professional footballer, playing as a winger in the English, Dutch and Austrian football leagues.

Colin Ayre began his career as an apprentice at Newcastle United, turning professional in September 1973. However, he failed to break into the first team at St. James' Park, leaving without making a first-team appearance.

In the 1975 close season he joined Dutch side Telstar and scored twice on his debut on 17 August 1975 as Telstar won 5–1 away to Excelsior. He scored a further goal in his third game and was a regular until early November, after which time he played only sporadically.

In September 1976, Torquay United rekindled Ayre's hopes of an English league career, his league debut coming on 18 September against Bradford City at Plainmoor. This was however followed by only one more league appearance, at home to Brentford a week later, before Ayre left to join his hometown side Ashington.

By 1979-80 he was back at Telstar and in November 1980, he joined Austrian side Wacker Innsbruck, helping them to the Austrian second division title in his first season. He played 18 times in total, before leaving in February 1982, joining Austrian second division side SPG Raika Innsbruck.

References

1956 births
Living people
English footballers
Newcastle United F.C. players
SC Telstar players
Torquay United F.C. players
Ashington A.F.C. players
FC Wacker Innsbruck players
English Football League players
Sportspeople from Ashington
Footballers from Northumberland
Association football midfielders
English expatriate sportspeople in Austria
English expatriate sportspeople in the Netherlands
Expatriate footballers in the Netherlands
Expatriate footballers in Austria
English expatriate footballers